Nhacra is a town in the Oio Region of Guinea-Bissau.

Oio Region
Populated places in Guinea-Bissau
Sectors of Guinea-Bissau